Sir William St Quintin, 4th Baronet (c. 1700 – 9 May 1770), of Harpham and Scampston in Yorkshire, was an English landowner and member of parliament.

He was the eldest son of Hugh St Quintin (b. 1671). He was educated at Newcome's School in Hackney. He succeeded to the family baronetcy and the Scampston estate near Malton on 30 June 1723 on the death of his uncle, Sir William St Quintin, 3rd Baronet, who had never married.

St Quintin entered Parliament in 1722 as a member for Thirsk, and remained its MP for five years. In 1729–30 he served as High Sheriff of Yorkshire.

He married Rebecca, daughter of Sir John Thompson, Lord Mayor of London, and their children included:
 William St Quintin (1729–1795) who succeeded to the baronetcy
 Mary (d. 1772), who married Vice-Admiral George Darby of Newtown
 Katherine, who married Christopher Griffith, MP, of Padworth
 John Chitty (1730–1746)
 Hugh St Quintin (1731–1736)
 Rebecca St Quintin (d. 1758)

References

 
 St Quintin genealogy

|-

1700 births
1770 deaths
People educated at Newcome's School
Baronets in the Baronetage of England
English landowners
Members of the Parliament of Great Britain for English constituencies
British MPs 1722–1727
High Sheriffs of Yorkshire